Fiddletown (from 1878 to 1932, Oleta) is a census-designated place in Amador County, California. It lies at an elevation of 1683 feet (513 m). The town is registered as a California Historical Landmark and is listed in the National Register of Historic Places (NPS-78000655). The community is in ZIP code 95629 and area code 209. Fiddletown's population was 235 at the 2010 census.

History

The town was first settled in 1849 reportedly by settlers from Missouri though no historical records have survived which confirm this. The earliest settlement was largely populated by transient miners living in tents or wooden sheds, though Fiddletown grew rapidly in 1852 when gold was discovered in the dry riverbeds of the surrounding area. A 22 mile canal was completed in 1853 which diverted the Cosumnes River and brought water to these riverbeds so that miners could pan for gold. This water source also supplied irrigation for local agriculture which further spurred the establishment of a permanent town. By 1854 the town reportedly had over 2000 residents.

During the 1850s the town began to develop a cohesive community with a number of community buildings and fraternal orders being founded. The first church was completed in 1853, and that same year the United States Postal Service opened a Fiddletown post office. As more families began to populate the town, the first school began accepting students around 1855. These community buildings were matched by community organizing with a number of fraternal organizations being established. One of the earliest was a division of the Sons of Temperance, founded to combat alcoholism and what one then-resident referred to as the "desecrating hand of vice [which] steals upon our citizens in the shape of Chinese and other prostitutes who have been driven from the cities".  A Jewish Society was formed in 1857 around the same time that a synagogue was established in the now county seat of Jackson, California. The Free Masons formed a lodge that same year, and in 1959 a lodge of Odd Fellows was established.

At the time of its founding, placer mining was the most popular mining technique, which is heavily dependent on water. The local water source, Dry Creek, ran dry during the summer months, during which time the miners were said to be "fiddling around," thus the name. Alternatively, the name was given because many of the early settlers from Missouri played fiddles for entertainment. However, one local citizen was embarrassed to be known as the "Man from Fiddletown" and successfully lobbied to have the name changed to Oleta (after his daughter) in 1878. The old name was restored in 1932.

Demographics

The 2010 United States Census reported that Fiddletown had a population of 235. The racial makeup of Fiddletown was 215 (91.5%) White, 0 (0.0%) African American, 5 (2.1%) Native American, 1 (0.4%) Asian, 0 (0.0%) Pacific Islander, 8 (3.4%) from other races, and 6 (2.6%) from two or more races. Hispanic or Latino of any race were 22 persons (9.4%).

The Census reported that 235 people (100% of the population) lived in households, 0 (0%) lived in non-institutionalized group quarters, and 0 (0%) were institutionalized.

There were 102 households, out of which 23 (22.5%) had children under the age of 18 living in them, 55 (53.9%) were opposite-sex married couples living together, 8 (7.8%) had a female householder with no husband present, 9 (8.8%) had a male householder with no wife present.  There were 2 (2.0%) unmarried opposite-sex partnerships, and 1 (1.0%) same-sex married couples or partnerships. 26 households (25.5%) were made up of individuals, and 9 (8.8%) had someone living alone who was 65 years of age or older. The average household size was 2.30.  There were 72 families (70.6% of all households); the average family size was 2.75.

The population was spread out, with 48 people (20.4%) under the age of 18, 12 people (5.1%) aged 18 to 24, 42 people (17.9%) aged 25 to 44, 78 people (33.2%) aged 45 to 64, and 55 people (23.4%) who were 65 years of age or older.  The median age was 51.6 years. For every 100 females, there were 95.8 males.  For every 100 females age 18 and over, there were 105.5 males.

The homeowner vacancy rate was 1.3%; the rental vacancy rate was 7.4%.  174 people (74.0% of the population) lived in owner-occupied housing units and 61 people (26.0%) lived in rental housing units.

Politics

Climate
According to the Köppen Climate Classification system, Fiddletown has a warm-summer Mediterranean climate, abbreviated "Csb" on climate maps.

Famous residents

Leon "Whitey" Thompson (1923-2005), author and former inmate of Alcatraz.

References

External links 

Fiddletown Preservation Society
A History of Chinese Americans in California: Fiddletown's Chinese American Community 

Census-designated places in Amador County, California
Mining communities of the California Gold Rush
Populated places in the Sierra Nevada (United States)
California Historical Landmarks
Historic districts on the National Register of Historic Places in California
National Register of Historic Places in Amador County, California
Populated places established in 1849
1849 establishments in California
Census-designated places in California
Populated places on the National Register of Historic Places in California